Tuomo Ojala (born 19 September 1979) is a Finnish snowboarder. He competed in the men's halfpipe event at the 2002 Winter Olympics.

References

1979 births
Living people
Finnish male snowboarders
Olympic snowboarders of Finland
Snowboarders at the 2002 Winter Olympics
Sportspeople from Lahti
20th-century Finnish people
21st-century Finnish people